Billy Bunter of Greyfriars School may refer to:

 Billy Bunter of Greyfriars School (novel), a 1947 novel by author Charles Hamilton, writing as Frank Richards
 Billy Bunter of Greyfriars School (TV series), a BBC Television show broadcast from 1952 to 1961